Leopoldo Armando Guerra Juárez (born 1954) is a Guatemalan public official and lawyer. He was the Director of the Registry of Citizens of the Supreme Electoral Tribunal of Guatemala since 2014 until 2020.

Biography
Leopoldo Guerra studied a specialization in criminal law at Harvard University. After that, he obtained a position as judge in the Judicial Branch, and was a judge of the Appeals Chamber for 35 years. Guerra was also a defense lawyer for soldiers accused of crimes against humanity committed during the Civil War.  

He was hired by the Supreme Electoral Tribunal in 2007 as an adviser to the legal area, and in 2014 he was appointed Director of the Citizens Registry by magistrate María Eugenia Villagrán. In 2019 he was questioned by the National Convergence Front and National Unity of Hope deputies to press and request legal information on the presidential candidacy of Thelma Aldana. However, on March 27, 2019, he requested precautionary measures before the Inter-American Court of Human Rights for threats generated by far-right groups, having registered Thelma Aldana as a presidential candidate.

Notes

References

Living people
1954 births
People from Guatemala City
20th-century Guatemalan judges
21st-century Guatemalan judges